Maurice Lartigue (29 October 1890 – 20 April 1956) was a French racing cyclist. He finished in last place in the 1912 Tour de France.

References

External links
 

1890 births
1956 deaths
French male cyclists
Sportspeople from Pyrénées-Atlantiques
Cyclists from Nouvelle-Aquitaine